Marasmarcha oxydactylus is a moth of the family Pterophoridae. It is found in Spain, Portugal, Switzerland, Austria France and Italy. In Europe, the northern limit of the range are the Austrian Alps. It is also found in North Africa.

The wingspan is 18–23 mm.

The larvae feed on round-leaved restharrow (Ononis rotundifolia).

References

Exelastini
Moths described in 1859
Plume moths of Africa
Plume moths of Europe
Taxa named by Otto Staudinger